The French Military Cemetery is a large cemetery located in Korçë, Albania. It is located near Rinia Park. The French military cemetery has 640 crosses. They mark the graves of the French soldiers that died here in the conflicts of the First World War.

References

Buildings and structures in Korçë
Cemeteries in Albania
French cemeteries
Military cemeteries
Tourist attractions in Korçë